Muga or MUGA may refer to:
 Assam silk
 Bodegas Muga, a Rioja winery
 MUGA scan
 Muga, Nepal, village
 Muga (river), Spain
 Muga River (Ethiopia)
 Multi-use games area
 MUGA World Pro Wrestling